Saturday Night Special is an American comedy-variety show that aired weekly Saturday nights on Fox.

Overview
This show was a competitor to Saturday Night Live, with a similar format of comedy skits and musicians. It debuted on April 1, 1996, through May 18, 1996, airing in the same timeslot as the temporarily displaced MADtv.

The theme song to the show was War's "Low Rider".  Two memorable skits involved Demi Moore (Roseanne) talking about her involvement in the movie "Striptease", and Zira (the chimpanzee woman from "Planet of the Apes") hosting a radio advice program.  There was also a skit in which Lauren Hutton (Jennifer Coolidge) pleasured herself while interviewing two black actors.

Cast
Jennifer Coolidge	.... 	Herself/Various Characters
Kathy Griffin	.... 	Herself/Various Characters
Laura Kightlinger	.... 	Herself/Various Characters
Bob Rubin
Warren Hutcherson
Heath Hyche	
Carl LaBove (as C.D. LaBove)
Carmen Electra (leader of the "Skin Tight Dancers" troupe on the show)

Guest celebrities
Yasmine Bleeth
Sharon Stone
Scott Wolf
Melissa Etheridge
Bush
Ben Stiller
Salt-N-Pepa
Max Perlich
Alice in Chains
D'Angelo
James Woods
John Goodman
Rodney Dangerfield
Lynn Whitfield
Coolio
Garbage
Rosie Perez
Tupac Shakur
Ice-T
Fugees
The Verve Pipe
Laura Leighton
Smothers Brothers
Radiohead
Jenny McCarthy
Green Day
Patti Smith
Vendela
Kiss

Production credits
Troy Miller and Keith Alcorn (Directors)
Roseanne Barr (Executive Producer)
Craig J. Nevius (Co-Producer)
Troy Miller (Producer)
Eric Beetner (Film Editor)
Michele Spadaro (Set Decorator)
Keith Alcorn and Nick Gibbons (Art Department)
Paul Claerhout (Animator)
Eric Mazer (Production Coordinator)
Kenneth Paul Schoenfeld {Makeup Department Head}
Gary M. Cambra(Music Composer)
Taylor M. Uhler (Music Composer)
Fox Network (Production Company)

See also 
List of late night network TV programs

References

External links
 

Fox Broadcasting Company original programming
1990s American sketch comedy television series
1996 American television series debuts
1996 American television series endings
1990s American variety television series
English-language television shows
Fox late-night programming
Television series created by Roseanne Barr